Gilfillan Lake is a lake in Ramsey County, in the U.S. state of Minnesota.

Gilfillan Lake was named for Charles D. Gilfillan.

See also
List of lakes in Minnesota

References

Lakes of Minnesota
Lakes of Ramsey County, Minnesota